Lith or LITH may refer to:

 Lith print, a type of photographic printing process
 Lith, Netherlands, a town in the Netherlands
 Al Lith, a city in Saudi Arabia
 Lake in the Hills, Illinois, a village in the United States
 The Institute of Technology at Linköping University (LiTH), Swedish faculty of science and engineering
 Lith., an abbreviation for Lithuania
 A standing stone

See also
 van der Lith and van Lith, Dutch-language surnames
 LithTech, a game engine developed by Monolith Productions
 Lith Payam, a Dinka community located in Jonglei State in South Sudan
 Lithium, a chemical element